The 8th Zouaves Regiment was an infantry unit of the French Army. Created in 1914, the unit was designated as 8th Marching Zouaves Regiment.

Creation and different nominations
 1914 : 8th Marching Zouaves Regiment
 1920 : redesignated 8th Zouaves Regiment
 1928 : dissolution
 1934 : reconstituted
 1940 : dissolution
 1946 : recreated under designation 8th Zouaves Demi-Brigade
 1956 : dissolution
 1959 : creation of the 8th Zouaves Battalion from the 3rd Battalion of the 21st Infantry Regiment
 1962 : dissolution

History

World War I 
The 8th Zouaves Regiment disembarked from Bordeaux and Sète between 7 and 15 August 1914, consisting of three battalions (1st, 2nd, and 4th), the 3rd battalion belonging to a marching tirailleur regiment at the corps of the Moroccan Division. On 20 August they were in the region of Mézières - Charleville.
In the following days, they heard the cannon of Charleroi. On 25 August, they crossed the border of Belgium, and that of Sugny, a small Belgian village, where they witnessed the burning of the villages of the Meuse and Semois. They welcomed the IX Corps and assumed the rearguard.

They engaged in combat at the corps of the Moroccan Division alongside the 4e RTT, the 7e RTA, and the RMLE.

1914 
 Unfolding on the Marne
 Yser
 October 1914: the 8th Zouaves took form with the four respective battalions and designated "8".

1915 
 In August 1915, the regimental colors were received. The regiment had three colonels throughout the war, lieutenants-colonel Modelon, Auronx and Lagarde. Lieutenant-colonel Modelon earned the regiment two palms and the fourragere with colors of the Croix de guerre 1914-1918. Under the command of Colonel Lagarde, the regiment conquered five palms, the fourragère with colors of the Médaille militaire, then the fourragère with colors of the Légion d'honneur. Conferred the Croix de Chevalier de la Légion d'Honneur to the regimental colors, the 8th Zouaves Regiment was cited seven times at the orders of the armed forces during the course of the war (1914-1918).
 Artois
 25 September - 6 October: Second Battle of Champagne

1916 
Verdun 1916
Somme

1917 
Verdun 1917

1918 
 Verdun
 Villers-Bretonneux
 Soissons/
 Chemin des Dames
 While only taking part, to life in the sector, the 8th Zouaves was in almost all the major action offensives of the war. The regiment was able to inscribe on the regimental colors: la Marne, Yser, Artois, Champagne, Somme, Moronvilliers, Verdun, Soissons, 18 July Chemin des Dames.

Interwar period 
After 1919, the regiment was in Oran. It dissolved in 1928, the 2nd Zouave replaced the 8th Zouave.
The regiment held garrison at Camp de Châlons in 1943. Accordingly, the regiment was motorised, the only regiment of Zouave in Metropole...

World War II 
 In 1940, the 8th Zouaves, with the 12th Motorised Infantry Division disappeared at Dunkirk.

Since 1945
 Formed a Commando unit in Algeria
 Algeria 1956 - 1962
 At the cease-fire on 19 March 1962 in Algeria, the 8th Zouaves Regiment constituted along with 91 other regiments, the 114 units of the local force through the accords of Evians on 18 March 1962. The 8th Zouaves Regiment formed a local unit force of the Algerian order of battle, the 496°UFL-UFO composed of 10% metropolitan military and 90% Muslim military personnel, while being at the service of the executive provisionary power of Algeria until the independence of Algeria.

Traditions

Regimental Colors

Decorations 
The Regimental Color are decorated with:

Légion d'honneur 
 Croix de guerre 1914-1918 with :
 7 palms and 1 silver star ,
 Ordre du Mérite Militaire Chérifien.
Fourragere:
 Fourragère with colors of Croix de guerre 1914-1918
 Fourragère with colors of the Médaille militaire.
 Fourragère with colors of the Légion d'honneur attributed to the regiment on 3 September 1918.

Honours

Battle honours
Saint-Gond 1914
Artois 1915
Champagne 1915
Les Monts 1917
Verdun 1917
Soissonnais 1918
Vauxaillon 1918

Regimental Commanders
 1914-1918
 lieutenant-colonel Modelon
 lieutenant-colonel Auroux
 lieutenant-colonel Lagarde
 colonel Cloitre in the 1920s
 1935 - 1937:  Colonel Dame
 1940
 lieutenant-colonel Anzemberger
 In 1956 Colonel Gaubillot and Commandant Bonamy

Notable Officers & Zouaves 
 Robert Jallet (1890-1945), served in the 8th Zouaves during World War I.
 Edgard Tupët-Thomé from October 1938 to 1940.

See also 
3rd Algerian Infantry Division

References

Infantry regiments of France
Military units and formations established in 1914
Military units and formations disestablished in 1962